The Clemens Ranchhouse, near Magdalena, New Mexico, was built in 1910.  It was listed on the National Register of Historic Places in 1979.

It was deemed "A splendid example of Railroad Era architecture in New Mexico".

It is located south of Magdalena, at the foot of Magdalena Peak, facing east towards the former mining town of Kelly.

In 1978 it served as the headquarters of a  cattle ranch.

References

Ranches in New Mexico
National Register of Historic Places in Socorro County, New Mexico
Houses completed in 1910